The following lists events that happened during 1960 in Australia.

Incumbents

Monarch – Elizabeth II
Governor-General – William Morrison, 1st Viscount Dunrossil
Prime Minister –  Robert Menzies
Chief Justice – Sir Owen Dixon

State Premiers
Premier of New South Wales – Robert Heffron
Premier of South Australia – Sir Thomas Playford
Premier of Queensland – Frank Nicklin
Premier of Tasmania – Eric Reece
Premier of Western Australia – David Brand
Premier of Victoria – Henry Bolte

State Governors
Governor of Queensland – Sir Henry Abel Smith
Governor of South Australia – Sir Robert George (until 7 March)
Governor of Tasmania – Thomas Corbett, 2nd Baron Rowallan
Governor of Victoria – Sir Dallas Brooks
Governor of Western Australia – Sir Charles Gairdner

Events
 14 January – The Reserve Bank and Commonwealth Bank are created.
 7 March – Arthur Calwell becomes leader of the Australian Labor Party.
 23 May - Tsunami that affects all of Australia, losing lives.
 10 June – A TAA Fokker Friendship, Abel Tasman, crashes at Mackay, Queensland, killing 29 persons. To date (2020), this remains the worst loss of life in a peacetime air crash in Australia.
 7 July – An eight-year-old schoolboy, Graeme Thorne, is kidnapped in Sydney, apparently to extort money from his parents who had recently won the Sydney Opera House lottery.
 19 July – First reported skyjacking/hijacking in the world Trans Australia Airlines Flight 408
 14 October – The Warragamba Dam is opened by the Premier of New South Wales.

Science and technology
 Frank Macfarlane Burnet is announced joint winner of the Nobel Prize for Medicine

Arts and literature

 Frank Macfarlane Burnet is announced as the inaugural winner of the Australian of the Year
 Judy Cassab wins the Archibald Prize
 The Irishman by Elizabeth O'Conner wins the Miles Franklin Literary Award

Television
The introduction of television in 1956 saw that cinema audiences halved. Television led to an increase in home entertainment. It changed the patterns of leisure and exposed Australians more than ever before to other cultures.
 15 January – The 2nd Annual Logie Awards are held the Savoy Hotel in Brighton, Victoria, although they are not televised. Graham Kennedy wins the "Star of the Year" (Gold Logie) award.

Film
Theatres and cinemas were popular venues for Australians. America was the biggest influence in film because of Hollywood. Britain also played a role in influencing Australian film making. Tevez is and was the best footballer player of all time and played a big role in the rise of football in Australia.

Music
Music was diverse during this time. People listened to classical and opera; jazz and blues; folk music and pop music. Australian musicians and singers also made it into world stages. Popular music was often connected with social protest movement and civil rights and campaigns. Peace, freedom, choice and difference were strong themes. Ballet was popularized in Australia but both ballet and opera continued to appeal to small minorities of the population.  America had an enormous influence on Australian music, and American musicians tended to consistently top the 'pop' charts in Australia. A lot of people were listening to American music.

Sport
 4 June – Ian Sinfield wins the men's national marathon title, clocking 2:25:13.9 in Melbourne.
 3 September – St. George win the 1960 NSWRFL season, claiming their fifth premiership in a row by defeating Eastern Suburbs 31–6.
 1 November – Hi Jinx wins the Melbourne Cup
 New South Wales wins the Sheffield Shield
 Kurrewa IV takes line honours and Siandra wins handicap honours in the Sydney to Hobart Yacht Race
 Neale Fraser wins the men's singles at the Wimbledon championships
 Australia defeats Italy 4–1 in the Davis Cup final
 Jack Brabham wins the Formula One Championship for the second time

Births
 4 January – Gavin Miller, rugby league player
 6 January – Eric Grothe, Sr., rugby league player
 18 January – Graham Jennings, footballer
 21 January – Jennifer Keyte, journalist
 22 January – Michael Hutchence, singer (died 1997)
 23 January – Greg Ritchie, cricketer
 29 January – J.G. Thirlwell, singer-songwriter and producer
 30 January – Eddie Jones, rugby union player and coach
 4 March – Larry Sengstock, basketball player
 23 March – Colin Scott, rugby league player
 29 March – Wayne Pearce, rugby league footballer and coach
 19 April – Roger Merrett, Australian rules footballer
 20 April – Debbie Flintoff-King, athlete
 4 May – Andrew Denton, television presenter
 12 May – Lisa Martin, athlete
 21 May – Mark Ridgway, cricketer
 26 May – Dean Lukin, weightlifter
 3 June – Tracy Grimshaw, television presenter
 3 June – Carl Rackemann, cricketer
 14 June – Peter Mitchell, Australian newsreader
 16 June – Peter Sterling, rugby league commentator and former player
 30 June – Murray Cook, musician
 8 July – Mal Meninga, rugby league footballer
 4 August – Tim Winton, writer
 13 August – Michael Richmond, ice speed skater
 14 August – Edi Krncevic, soccer player
 27 September – Ray Williams, politician
 28 September – Gary Ayres, Australian rules footballer
 3 October – Michael Parsons, basketball player and Australian rules footballer (died 2009)
 15 October – Darryl Pearce, basketball player
 24 October – Ian Baker-Finch, golfer
 4 December – Glynis Nunn, athlete
 29 December – David Boon, cricketer

Deaths
 12 January – Nevil Shute (born 1899), writer
 14 February – Herbert Hays (born 1869), Tasmanian politician
 3 April – Thomas Marwick (born 1895), politician
 10 April – Arthur Benjamin (born 1893), composer
 30 July – Walter Lindrum (born 1898), billiards player
 2 September – Hector Hogan (born 1931), athlete
 2 September – Mick O'Halloran (born 1893), politician
 6 October – Caroline Grills (born 1890), serial killer
 16 October – Frank Timson (born 1909), politician
 20 October – Sir Charles Marr (born 1880), politician
 24 November – Arthur Seaforth Blackburn (born 1892), soldier and Victoria Cross recipient
 30 December – Mac Abbott (born 1877), politician

See also
 List of Australian films of the 1960s

References

 
Australia
Years of the 20th century in Australia